Barrie Gosney (1926, Surrey – 24 January 2008) was a British television, film and theatrical actor.

In a career spanning five decades, Gosney played roles in Up Pompeii, Last of the Summer Wine, Believe Nothing, Time Gentlemen Please, Keeping Up Appearances and Harry Hill.

He is perhaps best remembered for his performances in Harry Hill's show in which he filled the role of an absurd type of continuity announcer and the character Ken Ford ("the man from 'The Joy of Sex' books...").
He would often send himself up and perform surreal impressions of various celebrities, including Barbra Streisand, Joan Collins & Cliff Richard.

He died on 24 January 2008 after complications resulting from a fall.  An episode of Al Murray's Happy Hour broadcast on ITV1 on 15 February 2008 was dedicated to him.

Selected filmography
 Carry On Jack (1963) – Coach Driver
 A Home of Your Own (1964)
 San Ferry Ann (1965) – Mini Dad
 Three Hats for Lisa (1965) – Reporter
 Futtocks End (1970)
 Up Pompeii (1971) – Major Domo
 Up the Chastity Belt (1971) – Meat Stall Holder
 Up the Front (1972) – Stage Manager
 Raising the Roof (1972) – Robbins
 Our Miss Fred (1972) – Bertie
 Don't Just Lie There, Say Something! (1974) – Police sergeant
 Are You Being Served? (1977) – Airport Security Guard (uncredited)
 Keeping Up Appearances (1992) – the Yokel

References

External links
 
Barrie Gosney on TV.com
Richard Herring reports Gosney's death

1926 births
2008 deaths
English male film actors
English male stage actors
English male television actors